Mukta Arts Limited is an Indian film production company, headquartered in Mumbai. Established in 1978, the company is involved in the production, distribution, exhibition and education in cinema and creative arts and production of digital software in television serials, web series and documentaries. It is the first Hindi film production company that listed on the stock exchange. Mukta Arts Limited has produced and co-produced 42 films in Hindi and other languages till date. It has distributed over 400 movies under the brand name Mukta movies distributors. In 2012 it entered into exhibition sector and launched its own chain of multiplex theatres under the name Mukta A2 Cinemas, now present at 18 locations in India including one in Bahrain with 54 screens.

The company also runs Whistling Woods International, a Film, Communication and Media Arts Institute since 2006.

History

On 24 October 1978 film maker Subhash Ghai set up his own film production company Mukta Films and produced a film titled Karz. In 1982, Subhash Ghai formed a new independent company as Mukta Arts Private Limited and produced and directed many movies including  Hero, Karma, Ram Lakhan, Saudagar, Trimurti, Khalnayak, Pardes, and Taal till 2000.

In 2000, Mukta Arts Limited became first Company from the Hindi Film Industry to be listed on the stock exchanges in India. Subsequently, it produced commercial movies like Yaadein, Aitraaz, Kisna, 36 China Town, Yuvraaj and Apna Sapna Money Money. In 2003, it produced low budget movies under the banner of Mukta searchlight films including Iqbal, Joggers Park, Rahul and Black and White. It won a National Award for IQBAL as best film on other social issues in 2006. It also set up a division for regional movies which produced three Marathi, one Bengali, one Punjabi and one Kannada movies. It set up its own all India distribution network and released many Hindi and English movies.

Key people

Subhash Ghai is the Founder and Chairman of Mukta Arts while Rahul Puri is the Managing Director. Prabuddha Gupta is the CFO of the group.

Film insurance

Mukta Arts became the first Indian film production company to establish the practice of securing film insurance through its movie ‘Taal’. The policy is now named the 'Cine Mukta' Policy.

Whistling Woods

In 2006 Mukta Arts Ltd promoted and set up India's largest Film and Television Training Institute at Film City, Mumbai called Whistling Woods International (WWI). It is affiliated with TISS (Tata Institute of Social Sciences) and provides Diplomas and Degrees to students in Arts and Crafts of Cinema, Animation, Music, Fashion and Management. The institute serves as a contributor and advisor to the Indian government through the Skills Ministry and the HRD Ministry.

Mukta A2 Cinemas

In the exhibition sector Mukta Arts Ltd holds a chain of multiplexes across India under Mukta A2 Cinema with 18 locations and 54 screens including one in Bahrain. Mukta Arts Ltd also has a joint venture in the exhibition programming space with a 55:45 shareholding split with UFO in the company Mukta VN. Mukta A2 Cinemas has also entered into a joint venture with Asian Cinemas under name Asian Mukta A2 Cinemas LLP which operates 10 screens in South India.

Mukta Digital Studio 

The digital arm of Mukta Arts Ltd is known as Mukta Digital Studio which oversees Mukta Arts group's content on television, web and various mobile platforms in production and acquisition. Mukta Digital Studio has already produced short films and music videos for Skill India, Communal Harmony, Namami gange, Kumbh India and Tree Plantation for various government departments.

Filmography

See also
 Subhash Ghai
 Whistling Woods International Institute

References

External links
 official website

Hindi cinema
Film production companies based in Mumbai
Indian companies established in 1978